Yvette and Yvonne Sylvander are Swedish twins who were the cover models who appeared as the first multi-subject Sports Illustrated Swimsuit Issue models.  They appeared together on the swimsuit issue cover of the January 19, 1976, issue.  They also appeared in the magazine.

Notes

Year of birth missing (living people)
Living people
Swedish twins
Swedish female models
Twin models
Sibling duos